The 2007–08 season was JS Kabylie's 43rd season in the Algerian top flight, They competed in National 1, the Algerian Cup, the CAF Confederation Cup and the Champions League.

Squad list
Players and squad numbers last updated on 18 November 2007.Note: Flags indicate national team as has been defined under FIFA eligibility rules. Players may hold more than one non-FIFA nationality.

Competitions

Overview

{| class="wikitable" style="text-align: center"
|-
!rowspan=2|Competition
!colspan=8|Record
!rowspan=2|Started round
!rowspan=2|Final position / round
!rowspan=2|First match
!rowspan=2|Last match
|-
!
!
!
!
!
!
!
!
|-
| National 1

| 
| style="background:gold;"| Champion
| 23 August 2007
| 26 May 2008
|-
| Algerian Cup

| colspan=2| Round of 64
| colspan=2| 27 December 2007
|-
| 2007 Champions League

| colspan=2| Group stage
| 21 July 2007
| 1 September 2007
|-
| 2008 Champions League

| First round
| Second round
| 21 March 2008
| 9 May 2008
|-
| Confederation Cup

| colspan=2| Play-off round
| 11 July 2008
| 27 July 2008
|-
! Total

National 1

League table

Results summary

Results by round

Matches

Algerian Cup

2007 Champions League

Group stage

Group A

2008 Champions League

First round

Second round

CAF Confederation Cup

Play-off round

Squad information

Playing statistics

|-

|-
! colspan=14 style=background:#dcdcdc; text-align:center| Players transferred out during the season

Goalscorers
Includes all competitive matches. The list is sorted alphabetically by surname when total goals are equal.

Transfers

In

Out

References

JS Kabylie seasons
JS Kabylie